An Unexpected Light: Travels in Afghanistan (1999) is a travel book written by British travel writer Jason Elliot. An Unexpected Light won the Thomas Cook Travel Book Award in the UK and became a New York Times bestseller in the US.

Awards and honors
2002: ALA Notable Books for Adults 
2000: Thomas Cook Travel Book Award
1999: New York Times bestseller

See also
Mirrors of the Unseen: Journeys in Iran

External links
Review by travelliterature.org which stated that it was "Outstanding: should become a classic".
Review by Philip Glazebrook of The Times newspaper

Books about Afghanistan
1999 non-fiction books
British travel books